M. Robert Aaron (August 21, 1922 – June 16, 2007) was an American electrical engineer specializing in telecommunications.

Aaron was born in Philadelphia, served in the United States Coast Guard during World War II, received his bachelor's (1949) and master's degree (1951) in Electrical Engineering from the University of Pennsylvania, and in 1951 joined Bell Laboratories in Murray Hill, New Jersey. There he helped design networks for various transmission systems, including TAT-1, the first repeatered transatlantic telephone cable system. He was also a key contributor to design of T1, the initial T-carrier system.

Aaron was a member of the National Academy of Engineering (1979), Fellow of the Institute of Electrical and Electronics Engineers and American Association for the Advancement of Science, and co-recipient of the IEEE Alexander Graham Bell Medal (1978).

He died in West Palm Beach, Florida in 2007.

References

External links 
 IEEE biography
 IEEE obituary
 National Academy of Engineering

Scientists at Bell Labs
1922 births
2007 deaths
University of Pennsylvania School of Engineering and Applied Science alumni
People from West Palm Beach, Florida
Scientists from Philadelphia
Fellow Members of the IEEE
Fellows of the American Association for the Advancement of Science
Members of the United States National Academy of Engineering
American electrical engineers
Engineers from Pennsylvania
20th-century American engineers
United States Coast Guard personnel of World War II